Krishna Aur Kans is a 2012 Hindi Flash-animated film produced and distributed by Reliance Entertainment. It was directed by Vikram Veturi. It was tax free in six states at the time of his release and released in Hindi, Tamil, Telugu, and English. A new mobile game was also launched on the occasion of Janmashtami after being inspired from film. It was the widest ever released animation movie in India.

Plot
The king and sorcerer Kans reigns as a tyrant over the Kingdom of Mathura and aims to conquer the world. To put an end to his bloodthirsty reign, the gods decide to incarnate on Earth Vishnu, who is born in the form of Krishna, son of Devaki, the sister of Kans. The baby, nephew of the tyrant, is born in the village of Vrindavan, where he is adopted by the village chief, Nanda, who raises him in the same way as his own slightly older son, Balram. Krishna grows up in a good mood and becomes a mischievous little boy, who makes his mother see all the colors and is always ready to play a trick on the Gopi, the cowherds who watch over him. But he distinguished himself very early on by his miraculous exploits, and the music of his flute charmed men and beasts. Krishna especially befriends a little girl of his age, Radha (his future wife in Hindu mythology), but also befriends several boys, including Madhumangal. He can also count on the help of the monkey Dabiloba and the lamb Hamsi. Krishna must soon come to the aid of the people of the kingdom and face the supernatural perils sent to him by Kans, mainly the demons Trinavarta, Bakasur and Putna. But, seeing Krishna easily defeating each of his envoys, Kans ends up challenging him to a duel in the coliseum of his capital. Several songs punctuate the film.

Voice cast
Original Hindi version:
Prachi Saathi as Krishna
Meghana Erande as Baby Krishna
Om Puri as Kans
Rajshree Nath as Radha
Juhi Chawla as Yashoda
Manoj Bajpai as Nanda
Anupam Kher as Gargacharya
Vinod Kulkarni as Trinavert
Sachin Pilgaonkar as Vasudeva
Supriya Pilgaonkar as Devaki
Meena Goculdas as Gwalan
Harish Bhimani as Subala
Ninad Kamat as Narad
Namrata Sawhney as Doruga
Sulakshana Khatri as Putna
A K Hangal as King Ugrasen

Reception
Akanksha Naval - Shetye of DNA said "The film is more of an engaging fare for children, but even the adults accompanying their kids will find themselves enjoying the film just as much, so go for it!". 
Bavesh Bhatia in his review on Imdb said "Not only an entertainer for your children, Krishna Aur Kans will keep you glued to your seat as you will definitely recall the bygone days of your childhood!"

Music

The music of the film was composed by Shantanu Moitra and the lyrics were penned by Swanand Kirkire and Vedavyasa Rangabhattacharya.

Awards and nominations

See also
List of indian animated feature films

References

External links

2010s Hindi-language films
Indian animated films
2012 computer-animated films
2012 films
Hindu mythological films
Films about Krishna
Animated films based on Mahabharata
Reliance Entertainment films